The Blue Ridge Rangers is the first solo studio album by John Fogerty, the former lead singer and lead guitarist of Creedence Clearwater Revival.

Upon its initial release by Fantasy Records in 1973, the album was credited to "The Blue Ridge Rangers" with no mention of Fogerty on the cover. Fogerty chose to do this in order to distance himself from his  legacy.  The LP was later reissued and credited to John Fogerty with a different cover design.  The CD reissue restores the original silhouette cover photo and credits the album to Fogerty. The album is made up entirely of traditional and country covers, and features Fogerty playing all the instruments.

The album peaked at #47 on the charts.  Two singles from the album became hits: "Jambalaya" which peaked at #16, and "Hearts of Stone" which peaked at #37.

In 2009, Fogerty released a sequel to this album, entitled The Blue Ridge Rangers Rides Again.

Track listing

See also 
 Creedence Clearwater Revival

References 

 [ AllMusic: ''The Blue Ridge Rangers - Biography]
  Billboard Review: Blue Ridge Rangers

John Fogerty albums
1973 debut albums
Fantasy Records albums
Albums produced by John Fogerty
Covers albums